Aeolosia atropunctata is a moth of the subfamily Arctiinae. It is found on Java.

References

Moths described in 1895
Lithosiini
Moths of Indonesia